Bilal Hussain (born 22 February 1984) is a Pakistani cricketer who played for Sialkot. He played in 38 first-class and 42 List A matches between 1998 and 2015.

References

External links
 

1984 births
Living people
Pakistani cricketers
Sialkot cricketers
Cricketers from Gujranwala
Gujranwala cricketers
Water and Power Development Authority cricketers
Sialkot Stallions cricketers